Mohd Zarulizwan Mazlan (born 19 January 1997) is a Malaysian footballer who plays for T-Team in the Malaysia Super League as a midfielder.

References

External links
 

1997 births
Living people
Malaysian footballers

Association football midfielders
Terengganu F.C. II players